Leah Shoard (born 23 May 1986) is an Australian netball player in the ANZ Championship, playing for the Southern Steel in New Zealand.

She played for the New South Wales Swifts in the 2008 season, having previously been signed for the Sydney Swifts and AIS Canberra Darters in the Commonwealth Bank Trophy. While she was not signed up for the Swifts for the 2009 season, in December 2008, the Southern Steel and Netball New Zealand announced that Shoard was allowed to join the New Zealand franchise in 2009, due to star shoot Donna Wilkins being unavailable for the first two rounds after the birth of her first child. Despite the eligibility rules for New Zealand franchises, the Steel fought to include Shoard over a New Zealand player, saying they needed a relatively experienced player to take the goal attack positions in the opening games.

In 2010, Shoard currently plays for the West Coast Fever in hopes to gain more court time after playing for one quarter for the Swifts in 2008 and two quarters for the Steel in 2009. In 2009, she only had one attempt and missed, giving her the lowest shooting percentage score of 0% (0/1). Should Shoard scored that attempt, she would have been the top of the shooting table at 100% (1/1).

References

1986 births
Living people
Australian netball players
Sydney Swifts players
New South Wales Swifts players
Southern Steel players
West Coast Fever players
AIS Canberra Darters players
Australian expatriate netball people in New Zealand
New South Wales state netball league players